Gísli Þorgeir Kristjánsson (born 30 July 1999) is an Icelandic handball player who plays for SC Magdeburg and the Icelandic national team.

Club career
Gísli Þorgeir Kristjánsson made his debut for his boyhood club FH Hafnarfjörður in the 2015/2016 season but it wasn't until the next season where he made his breakthrough to the first team, where he helped FH secure the league cup. In the summer of 2018 he moved to the German Handball Bundesliga to THW Kiel, where he signed a three-year contract. With Kiel he won the DHB-Pokal in 2019 and became German champion 2020. 

In 2020, he transferred to SC Magdeburg. He won the IHF Super Globe 2021, and the 2021–22 EHF European League. In 2022 he got a silver medal in EHF European League, and became German Champion. He also won 2022 IHF Super Globe.

International career
At the U-18 European Championship 2016 in Croatia Gísli was the most successful Icelandic shooter with 53 goals. On 26 October 2017 he made his debut for the Icelandic national team in a 31:29-victory against Sweden in friendly.

Football career
Before completely focusing on handball he played football as well. In 2014 he was selected for the Iceland squad to compete in the 2014 Summer Youth Olympics. He played two games in the tournament and won a bronze medal with the Icelandic team.

Personal life
His father is Kristján Arason is a former handball player who became German champion with VfL Gummersbach and his mother, Þorgerður Katrín Gunnarsdóttir, is an Icelandic politician who served as Minister of Education, Science, and Culture and Minister of Fisheries and Agriculture.

References

External links
THW Kiel profile
EHF profile

1999 births
Living people
Gisli Thorgeir Kristjansson
Gisli Thorgeir Kristjansson
Expatriate handball players
Gisli Thorgeir Kristjansson
Handball-Bundesliga players
THW Kiel players
SC Magdeburg players
Gisli Thorgeir Kristjansson
Association footballers not categorized by position